Arthur Ashe Stadium is a tennis stadium at Flushing Meadows–Corona Park in Queens, New York City. Part of the USTA Billie Jean King National Tennis Center, it is the main stadium of the US Open tennis tournament and has a capacity of 23,771, making it the largest tennis stadium in the world.

The stadium is named after Arthur Ashe (1943–1993), winner of the inaugural 1968 US Open, the first in which professionals could compete. The original stadium design, completed in 1997, had not included a roof.  After suffering successive years of event delays from inclement weather, a new lightweight retractable roof was completed in 2016.

History

Opened in 1997, the facility replaced Louis Armstrong Stadium as the primary venue for the tournament. It cost $254 million to construct, and then had 22,547 seats, 90 luxury suites, five restaurants, and a two-level players' lounge, making it by far the largest tennis-only venue in the world. Like the other  in the facility, it has a DecoTurf cushioned acrylic surface.

On August 25, 1997, the stadium opened by hosting the US Open, with Whitney Houston singing "One Moment in Time" during the stadium's inauguration ceremonies and dedicating the performance to the late Arthur Ashe.

The first official match played on the court was at the 1997 US Open between Tamarine Tanasugarn of Thailand and Chanda Rubin of the United States. Tanasugarn won in two sets.

The stadium has also hosted the first-ever outdoor regular season WNBA game in 2008; the Indiana Fever beat the host New York Liberty    The game served as a fundraising event for breast cancer research.

The facility features a Hawk-Eye electronic system which allows tennis players to challenge the umpire's decision on calls made throughout championships. In 2005, the color scheme for the courts was changed from green to electric blue inner courts and a light green outer court. All US Open Series events now use this color scheme, providing television viewers a more easily trackable ball — with the yellow tennis balls contrasting more visibly against the blue courts.

On July 26–28, 2019, the stadium hosted the Fortnite World Cup, a three-day long esports tournament with a prize pool of 30 million, $3 million of which awarded to the winner of the Finals.

During the COVID pandemic, the stadium was converted for use as a hospital.

On September 22, 2021, the stadium hosted All Elite Wrestling. Dynamite was filmed live, alongside tapings for Rampage as well as Elevation. The Dynamite and Rampage episodes were titled "Grand Slam" with Rampage expanded to two hours for the special. The event marked AEW's debut show in New York City and the first professional wrestling show ever held at the tennis complex.

On November 3, 2022, the Westminster Kennel Club Dog Show announced the primary event will move to Arthur Ashe Stadium in 2023.

Retractable roof 

Lacking a roof, where relatively strong and unpredictable winds could occur inside the stadium, events were vulnerable to inclement weather — and five straight years of rain delays occurred during the US Open men's singles final from 2008 to 2012.

Despite the original design's lacking provisions for a roof, the USTA announced in 2013 plans to construct a roof for the stadium using a  superstructure — having consulted "with every architect involved in the design of a stadium roof in North America."

Notably, the site of the Ashe center featured poor soil conditions.  It had previously been Manhattan's Corona Ash Dumps (featured prominently in F. Scott Fitzgerald's The Great Gatsby as the Valley of Ashes) and prior to that a natural wetland swamp.  For the new roof, a very light solution was critical.

The stadium is not fully conditioned; a new chilled water ventilation system controls humidity when the roof is closed. The new cantilevering design is supported by eight columns that sit on concrete bases, each supported by 20 piles driven 150 to 200 feet deep and has a data acquisition and recording system along with synchronized cameras to interpret the data created by the complex control systems. The roof, which cost $150 million, was part of a $550 million renovation of the National Tennis Center. The retractable roof project was completed in 2016.

The roof was designed by Rossetti Architects and its structure engineered by WSP Global. Geiger Engineers designed the roof's mechanization system.  Engineer of Record for the mechanization system was Hardesty & Hanover in partnership with Morgan Engineering.

See also

List of tennis stadiums by capacity

References

External links

Ashe Stadium Seating Chart

Tennis venues in New York City
Sports venues in Queens, New York
US Open (tennis)
Sports venues completed in 1997
Flushing Meadows–Corona Park
1997 establishments in New York City
Retractable-roof stadiums in the United States